The Sélingué Dam is an embankment dam with a gravity section located in the Sikasso Region, on the Sankarani River, one of the affluents of the Niger River. It is an important center of energy production in Mali surpassed only by the Manantali Dam on the Bafing River.

Its construction, at the cost of 140 million US dollars, was financed by several backers.

With a power output of 44 MW, the dam has an energy output of 200 million kilowatt-hours per year. The dam provides Bamako, Kati, Koulikoro, Ségou, Fana, Dioïla, Yanfolila and Kalana with electricity. It was brought into service in 1982, and renovated between 1996 and 2001.

The retaining basin of the dam forms the artificial Lake Sélingué. The water level has a maximum height of  but varies throughout the year. It allows agriculture on the irrigated perimeters, managed by the Office of Rural Development of Sélingué, as well as fishing.

Notes

References
.
. Also published in French with the title  "Le Niger: une Artère vitale. Gestion efficace de l’eau dans le bassin du Haut Niger".

Further reading
.
.

External links

 Reversing Land and Water Degradation Trends in the Niger River Basin. World Bank, 2003.
 

Dams completed in 1982
Energy infrastructure completed in 1982
Hydroelectric power stations in Mali
Dams in Mali
Embankment dams
1982 establishments in Mali
Sikasso Region